Placement Group C of the 1998 Fed Cup Americas Zone Group II was one of six pools in the Americas Zone Group I of the 1998 Fed Cup. The three teams that placed third in the initial pools competed in a round robin competition, with the teams placing second and third relegated to Group II for 1999.

Uruguay vs. Peru

Chile vs. Uruguay

Chile vs. Peru

  and  placed second and third in this pool, and there were relegated down to Group II for 1999. Both teams placed first in their pools of four, and thus proceeded the knockout stage. Uruguay won two matches in the knockout stage and thus advanced back to Group I for 2000, while Peru only won one match and thus remained in Group II for 2000.

See also
Fed Cup structure

References

External links
 Fed Cup website

1998 Fed Cup Americas Zone